P71 is an offshore patrol vessel of the Maritime Squadron of the Armed Forces of Malta. The ship, which is the Maritime Squadron's largest ever vessel and the lead ship of the OPV748 class, was constructed by the Italian . It was launched in February 2021 and completed in November 2022. P71 is expected to be officially commissioned in January 2023 and also to replace P61 as the flagship of the Maritime Squadron.

Construction

In 2015 the Maltese Government wanted to expand the Maritime Squadron as the Diciotti-class P61 was struggling to keep up with the demands faced by patrolling Malta's large SAR Region and its territorial waters, as well as being in need of a major overhaul. Considering the gap that would be left for such as overhaul to take place, the Irish Naval Service donated the LÉ Aoife to help reduce the strains on the P61. 

The contract was publicly signed on 16 January 2019. Originally, building was to start in early 2019, for delivery in late 2020. 

On 7 March 2019, it was announced that the contract for the provision of the marine propulsion package for P71 was awarded to Rolls-Royce.  The vessel was launched by Cantiere Navale Vittoria on 27 February 2021. 

P71 underwent sea-acceptance trials between March 2022 and August 2022, with the official trials following thereafter. 
The ship, which was the biggest ever warship constructed by Cantiere Navale Vittoria to date, was delivered in November 2022 and on 8 November 2022, it entered Haywharf for the first time. It will be officially commissioned in January 2023.

Ultimately, the vessel cost €48.6 million to construct.

Design 

P71 is 78.4 metres long, with a beam of 13.0 metres and a maximum draft of 4.8 metres. At full load, P71 will displace . Propulsion is provided by 2 Rolls-Royce PROMAS controllable-pitch propellers, which can allow P71 to reach maximum speeds of over 20 knots (37 km/h; 23 mph). P71 is powered by two Wärtsilä diesel engines with Power-take-in of  each.

The vessel has 5 decks. At the front of the main deck, one can find the main gun, a OTO single 25mm calibre Oerlikon KBA remote controlled weapon station. The main feature of P71 is the elevated bridge with 360-degree vision capabilities, which is equipped with ballistic protection according to level 2 of the STANAG 4569. Besides the main gun, P71 is also armed with a  12.7-mm machine gun and two 7.62 mm machine guns. The vessel also has an armoury with ammunition, rifles and pistols. 

P71 also has a helicopter deck which caters for the landing and refuelling of seven ton helicopters, like the AgustaWestland AW139 operated by the Air Wing. The vessel is also equipped with two 9.1 metres-long rigid inflatable boats, with one located on the starboard side and the other on the stern. Both RHIBs can reach a maximum speed of 40 knots (64 km/h; 46 mph). It also has an integrated command, control and navigation system, which includes a 2D surveillance radar, a navigation radar and satellite communications.
 
P71 can accommodate a crew of 40, with space for further 20 personnel. Aboard the vessel, one can also find
a medical facility where personnel can receive medical treatment.

The vessel has an endurance of at least 15 days.

References

External links 
 

2021 ships
Naval ships of Malta